Clément Depres (born 25 November 1994) is a French professional footballer who plays as a forward for Rodez AF.

References

1994 births
Living people
Footballers from Nîmes
French footballers
Association football forwards
Nîmes Olympique players
LB Châteauroux players
Rodez AF players
Ligue 1 players
Ligue 2 players
Championnat National players
Championnat National 3 players